Zygometridae is a family of echinoderms belonging to the order Comatulida.

Genera:
 Catoptometra Clark, 1908 
 Zygometra Clark, 1907

References

Comatulida